In enzymology, a mucinaminylserine mucinaminidase is an enzyme that catalyzes the chemical reaction

D-galactosyl-3-(N-acetyl-beta-D-galactosaminyl)-L-serine + H2O  D-galactosyl-3-N-acetyl-beta-D-galactosamine + L-serine

Thus, the two substrates of this enzyme are D-galactosyl-3-(N-acetyl-beta-D-galactosaminyl)-L-serine and H2O, whereas its two products are D-galactosyl-3-N-acetyl-beta-D-galactosamine and L-serine.

This enzyme belongs to the family of hydrolases, specifically those glycosidases that hydrolyse O- and S-glycosyl compounds.  The systematic name of this enzyme class is D-galactosyl-3-(N-acetyl-beta-D-galactosaminyl)-L-serine mucinaminohydrolase. Other names in common use include endo-alpha-N-acetylgalactosaminidase, and endo-alpha-N-acetyl-D-galactosaminidase.

References

 
 
 

EC 3.2.1
Enzymes of unknown structure